Košarkaški klub Cibona, commonly referred to as Cibona Zagreb or simply Cibona, is a men's professional basketball club based in Zagreb, Croatia. The club is a founding member and shareholder of the Adriatic Basketball Association, and competes in the Adriatic League and the Croatian League.

History

Formation and early years
Cibona's history dates to late autumn of 1945 when Sloboda (Freedom) was founded as a sports society of bank workers, craftsmen, traders, and clerks. On April 24, 1946 thanks to basketball enthusiast Branimir Volfer and his friends Ljubo Prosen and Joso Miloš, basketball section of Sloboda, the predecessor of today's Cibona, is formed. Its first game was against local rival Slavija on May 7, 1946. Sloboda did not last too long under that name as in November 1946 it merged with Tekstilac, Amater and Grafičar into Sportsko društvo Zagreb (Sports Society Zagreb). Name changing continued through the next four years. In late 1948 it was known as Vihor (Vortex) and already in 1949 as Polet (Elan). Finally, in June 1950, the club changed the name to Lokomotiva (Locomotive) and that name is going to stick for the next 25 years. Lokomotiva competed in Yugoslav top division since 1951, with only two years (1952 and 1960) spent in the second division.

First trophies
Lokomotiva's first major trophy came in 1969, when they won the Yugoslav Cup, led by legendary Hall of Famer Mirko Novosel. The final game against AŠK Olimpija was played in Lokomotiva's new basketball hall "Kutija šibica" (literally meaning Matchbox). Led by phenomenal trio Većeslav Kavedžija, Nikola Plećaš and Milivoj Omašić, Lokomotiva won the game 78:77.

Their first European trophy came in 1972 when Lokomotiva won the premier edition of FIBA Korać Cup. Their opponent in finals was OKK Beograd and the first game was played in Belgrade. OKK Beograd won the first game 83:71 but in a return match Lokomotiva, led by great Nikola Plećaš (nicknamed Sveti Nikola) who scored 40 points, trashed the Belgrade side by 94–73.

Cibona's glory years

In November 1975, the basketball club split away from the Lokomotiva sports society and came under the direct control of the municipal authorities of the city of Zagreb. Politicians such as Slavko Šajber became very influential in the club during this period and set about getting the club some financial support. In that regard, the club's main sponsors became four SR Croatia-based food industry giants (all of them state-owned at the time): Kraš, Franck, Badel and Voće. The club took the name Cibona, taken from the Latin cibus bonus, which translates to good food.

For the first trophy under the new name Cibona, they had to wait until 1980, when they won the Yugoslav Cup. The Final match was played in Borovo, and Cibona's opponent was mighty Bosna, led by Bogdan Tanjević on the bench, and Mirza Delibašić on the court. But Cibona, led by impressive Andro Knego, managed to beat them 68:62. This trophy marked the beginning of Cibona's golden era, influenced by two great basketball players and Hall of Famers – Krešimir Ćosić and Dražen Petrović. Between 1980 and 1988, Cibona won 14 major trophies: 3 Yugoslav League championships (1982, 1984, 1985), 7 Yugoslav Cups (1980, 1981, 1982, 1983, 1985, 1986, 1988), 2 FIBA European Champions Cups (1985, 1986), and 2 Cup Winners' Cups (1982, 1987).

At the beginning of the war in the Former Yugoslavia in 1991, the team was forced to emigrate in order to play their games, and in an area with the minimum guarantees required by FIBA. For this reason, the club played in Spain for two years (seasons 1991–92 and 1992–93), specifically in Puerto Real (Cádiz).

Croatian powerhouse
In independent Croatia, Cibona became a dominant force strongly backed both politically and economically. The crisis of traditionally powerful Dalmatian clubs Split, Zadar and Šibenik also came in hand and Cibona won 11 national titles in a row (from 1992 to 2002). They were also regular Euroleague participant, reaching quarterfinals in 1996/97 and 1999/00.

Cibona's dominance in the national championship was broken in 2003 when Split CO led by coach Petar Skansi, legendary Dino Rađa and revived talent Josip Sesar won the championship. Cibona regained the title next season but was beaten in finals by Zadar season after. In 2005–06 and 2006–07 Cibona won championships beating Zadar in the final series twice but then shockingly missed the final series in 2007/08 after Split eliminated them in semifinal series.

In 2001 regional basketball league called Adriatic League was formed and Cibona took part in it. After disappointing first and second season, Cibona hosted Final Four and reached the final game in 2003/04 but was defeated on the home court by FMP Reflex.

Recent seasons
Recent seasons have been a mixture of success and failure for Cibona.

In national championship, Cibona won four out of five recent league titles but this dominance is seriously put on test by the rise of large company backed Cedevita.

In European competitions, Cibona lost its Euroleague license for the 2011/12 season after competing in Euroleague since its formation. During 2011/12 and 2012/13 seasons Cibona competed in Eurocup but failed to win any game.

In regional ABA League Cibona had a great 2009/10 season. Cibona entered the Final four held in Arena Zagreb as a top-seeded team. After beating Union Olimpija in semifinals, Cibona faced Partizan in the final game. Partizan won the title thanks to an off-the-glass three-pointer by Dušan Kecman from half-court at the buzzer, bringing the celebration of Cibona players and staff (who already invaded the floor as Bojan Bogdanović scored a corner three-pointer for Cibona with just 0.6 seconds left on the clock) to an abrupt end. The final score was 75–74 and Cibona once again didn't manage to win a title at the home court. The next three seasons in the regional league were disappointing for Cibona, finishing 12th, 7th, and 11th.

In the 2013–14 season, under head coach Slaven Rimac, Cibona won the ABA League championship, despite huge financial problems the club was facing. As a champion of the league, Cibona had direct spot in the Euroleague, but withdrew from it in order to stabilize financially. Eventually, Crvena Zvezda, as third in the standings, took its spot in the Euroleague.

Honours
Total titles: 44

Domestic competitions
 Croatian League 
 Winners (20): 1991–92, 1992–93, 1993–94, 1994–95, 1995–96, 1996–97, 1997–98, 1998–99, 1999–00, 2000–01, 2001–02, 2003–04, 2005–06, 2006–07, 2008–09, 2009–10, 2011–12, 2012–13, 2018–19, 2021–22
 Runners-up (7): 2002–03, 2004–05, 2013–14, 2014–15, 2015–16, 2016–17, 2017–18

 Croatian Cup
 Winners (9): 1994–95, 1995–96, 1998–99, 2000–01, 2001–02, 2008–09, 2012–13, 2021–22, 2022–23
 Runners-up (11): 1991–92, 1993–94, 1996–97, 1999–00, 2002–03, 2004–05, 2007–08, 2009–10, 2017–18, 2018–19, 2019–20

 Yugoslav League (defunct)
 Winners (3): 1981–82, 1983–84, 1984–85
 Runners-up (4): 1960–1961, 1970–71, 1980–81, 1985–86

 Yugoslav Cup (defunct)
 Winners (8): 1968–69, 1979–80, 1980–81, 1981–82, 1982–83, 1984–85, 1985–86, 1987–88
 Runners-up (2): 1971–72, 1990–91

European competitions

 EuroLeague
 Winners (2): 1984–85, 1985–86
 FIBA Saporta Cup (defunct)
 Winners (2): 1981–82, 1986–87
 Semifinalist (3): 1980–81, 1983–84, 1988–89
 FIBA Korać Cup (defunct)
 Winners (1): 1971–1972
 Runners-up (2): 1979–80, 1987–88
 European Super Cup (semi-official, defunct)
 Winners (1): 1987
 Runners-up (1): 1986

 Euroleague Opening Tournament (1): 2001

Regional competitions
 Adriatic League Winners (1): 2013–14
 Runners-up (3): 2003–04, 2008–09, 2009–10

Worldwide competitions
 FIBA Intercontinental Cup 3rd place (3): 1985, 1986, 1987

Other competitions
 FIBA International Christmas Tournament (defunct)
 3rd place (1): 1992
 Charleroi, Belgium Invitational Game Winners (1): 2008
 Porec, Croatia Invitational Game Winners (1): 2009
 Zagreb, Croatia Invitational Game Winners (1): 2009
 Županja, Croatia Invitational Game Winners (1): 2010
 Drazen Petrovic Cup Runners-Up (1): 2014
 Rijeka Tournament Winners (1): 2015

Individual club awards
 Triple Crown Winners (1): 1984–85
 Small Triple Crown Winners (1): 1981–82

Season by season record
The following table shows the records from the season 1990–91 in all competitions:

Home arenas
Open basketball court in Kranjčevićeva street (1946–1947)
Open basketball court Tuškanac (1947–1969)
Kutija Šibica Sports Hall (1969–1987)
Dražen Petrović Basketball Hall (1987–present)

Players

Current roster

 

Depth chart

Retired numbers

 4 –  Mihovil Nakić
 10 –  Dražen Petrović
 11 –  Andro Knego
 20 –  Marin Rozić

Players at the NBA Draft

Notable players

Members of the Basketball Hall of Fame
 Krešimir Ćosić
 Mirko Novosel
 Dražen Petrović
 Dino Rađa

 Personnel 
 Head coaches 

 Management 
Current officeholders are:
 President: Mario Petrović 
 Members of the Assembly: Mladen Bušić, Mario Petrović, Ivan Artuković, Jasmin Jurkovac, Krešimir Gunjača
 General manager: Mauro Lukić

 Top performances in European and worldwide competitions 

The road to the European Cup victories1972 FIBA Korać Cup1981–82 FIBA European Cup Winners' Cup{| class="wikitable" style="text-align: left; font-size:95%"
|- bgcolor="#ccccff"
! Round
! Team
! Home
!   Away  
|-
|rowspan=3|Quarter-finals
| Sutton & Crystal Palace
| style="text-align:center;"|105–97
| style="text-align:center;"|74–70
|-
| Sinudyne Bologna
| style="text-align:center;"|121–91
| style="text-align:center;"|81–88
|-
| Hapoel Ramat Gan
| style="text-align:center;"|98–97
| style="text-align:center;"|81–85
|-
|Semi-finals
| Stroitel
| style="text-align:center;"|92–66
| style="text-align:center;"|66–82
|-
|Final
| Real Madrid
| colspan="2" style="text-align:center;"|96–95
|}

1984–85 FIBA European Champions Cup

1986–87 FIBA European Cup Winners' Cup

References

External links

 Official website 
 KK Cibona at Eurobasket.com
 Cibona vs Real Madrid 1985 European Champions Cup Final

 
Basketball teams in Croatia
1946 establishments in Croatia
Basketball teams established in 1946
KK Cibona
EuroLeague-winning clubs
Basketball teams in Yugoslavia